Eupithecia erectinota is a moth in the family Geometridae first described by William Warren in 1904. It is found in Peru.

References

Moths described in 1904
erectinota
Moths of South America